Taheebo extract can refer to:

The bark of Tabebuia, a genus of tree native to Central and South America
Lapacho, a tea made from Tabebuia